Blue carbon is a term used in the climate change mitigation context that refers to "biologically driven carbon fluxes and storage in marine systems that are amenable to management." 

Most commonly, it refers to the role that tidal marshes, mangroves and seagrasses can play in carbon sequestration., however it also includes efforts in the deep ocean waters where the vast majority of ocean carbon is held. Such ecosystems can contribute to climate change mitigation and also to ecosystem-based adaptation. When blue carbon ecosystems are degraded or lost they release carbon back to the atmosphere.

Blue carbon management methods can be grouped into ocean-based biological carbon dioxide removal (CDR) methods. They are a type of biologic carbon sequestration.

There is increasing interest in developing blue carbon potential. Research is ongoing. In some cases it has been found that these types of ecosystems remove far more carbon per area than terrestrial forests. However, the long-term effectiveness of blue carbon as a carbon dioxide removal solution remains contested.

Definition 

Blue carbon is defined as: "Biologically driven carbon fluxes and storage in marine systems that are amenable to management." 

Deep blue carbon is located in the high seas beyond national jurisdictions. It includes carbon contained in "continental shelf waters, deep-sea waters and the sea floor beneath them" and makes up 90% of all ocean carbon.

Coastal blue carbon focuses on "rooted vegetation in the coastal zone, such as tidal marshes, mangroves and seagrasses". Seagrass, salt marshes and mangroves are sometimes referred to as "blue forests" in contrast to land-based "green forests".

Blue carbon management methods can be grouped into ocean-based biological carbon dioxide removal (CDR) methods. They are a type of biologic carbon sequestration.

Role in climate change context 
The term "blue carbon" was coined in 2009 to highlight the contribution of coastal vegetated ecosystems to climate change mitigation.

The vegetated coastal ecosystems of tidal marshes, mangroves and seagrasses (which are grouped as "blue carbon") have high carbon burial rates. This is because they accumulate carbon in their soils and sediments.  

Such ecosystems can contribute to climate change mitigation and also to ecosystem-based adaptation. However, when coastal blue carbon ecosystems are degraded or lost they release carbon back to the atmosphere.  

While "deep blue carbon" terminology has been used in passing as early as 2017, it has recently become a staple of international ocean research centres, most notably championed by the Ocean Frontier Institute, which made it a centrepiece of their participation at COP27.  Previously seen as "less amenable to management" and challenging due to lack of data "relating to the permanence of their carbon stores",  in terms of net-new-carbon sequestration deep blue carbon offers an estimated 10-20 times higher potential than coastal blue carbon to achieve net-zero goals.

Mangroves, salt marshes and seagrasses can store carbon and are highly efficient carbon sinks. They capture  from the atmosphere by sequestering the carbon in their underlying sediments, in underground and below-ground biomass, and in dead biomass.

Although vegetated coastal ecosystems cover less area and have less aboveground biomass than terrestrial plants they have the potential to impact longterm C sequestration, particularly in sediment sinks. 

One of the main concerns with blue carbon is that the rate of loss of these important marine ecosystems is much higher than any other ecosystem on the planet, even compared to rainforests. Current estimates suggest a loss of 2-7% per year, which is not only lost carbon sequestration, but also lost habitat that is important for managing climate, coastal protection, and health.

Impacts of habitat decline on carbon storage and release 
As habitats that sequester carbon are altered and decreased, that stored amount of C is being released into the atmosphere, continuing the current accelerated rate of climate change. Impacts on these habitats globally will directly and indirectly release the previously stored carbon, which had been sequestered in sediments of these habitats. Declines of vegetated coastal habitats are seen worldwide.

Quantifying rates of decrease are difficult to calculate, however measurements have been estimated by researchers indicating that if blue carbon ecosystems continue to decline, for any number of reasons, 30-40% of tidal marshes and seagrasses and approximately 100% of mangroves could be gone in the next century.

Reasons for decline of mangroves, seagrass, and marshes include land use changes, climate and drought related effects, dams built in the watershed, convergence to aquaculture and agriculture, land development and sea-level rise due to climate change. Increases in these activities can lead to significant decreases in habitat available and thus increases in released C from sediments. 

As anthropogenic effects and climate change are heightened, the effectiveness of blue carbon sinks will diminish and CO2 emissions will be further increased. Data on the rates at which CO2 is being released into the atmosphere is not robust currently; however, research is being conducted to gather a better information to analyze trends. Loss of underground biomass (roots and rhizomes) will allow for CO2 to be emitted changing these habitats into sources rather than carbon sinks.

Impacts of nutrient load
Increases in carbon capture and sequestration have been observed in both mangrove and seagrass ecosystems which have been subjected to high nutrient loads, either intentionally or due to waste from human activities. 

Research done on mangrove soils from the Red Sea have shown that increases in nutrient loads to these soils do not increase carbon mineralization and subsequent CO2 release. This neutral effect of fertilization was not found to be true in all mangrove forest types. Carbon capture rates also increased in these forests due to increased growth rates of the mangroves. In forests with increases in respiration there were also increases in mangrove growth of up to six times the normal rate.

Contribution to carbon storage

Deep ocean 
Further information: Carbon sequestration techniques in oceans

The ocean covers approximately 70% of the earth’s surface with an average depth of 3800 m. The deeper layers of the ocean are greatly unsaturated in regard to CO2 and its dissolved forms, carbonic and bicarbonic acid, and their salts. Deep ocean water contains about 3 × 1010 g carbon per cubic km and the total carbon content of the deep ocean (> 500 m) is approximately 5.1 × 10 22 g. At present, anthropogenic emissions of carbon equal about 6.8 × 1015 g y−1. "If all the emissions were injected into the deep ocean, they would scarcely make a dent in the deep ocean’s carbon content."

At depths greater than 3 km, CO2 becomes liquefied and sinks to the seafloor due to it being higher density than the surrounding seawater. Mathematical models have shown that CO2 stored in deep sea sediments beyond 3 km could provide permanent geological storage even with large geomechanical perturbations. Deep ocean storage can present a potential sink for large amounts of anthropogenic CO2. Other deep water carbon storage techniques currently bing explored include, seaweed farming and algae, ocean fertilization, artificial upwelling, and basalt storage. 

The IPCC has recognized the potential of ocean CO2 storage, and organizations such as the Ocean Frontier Institute are investing significant resources into 'deep blue carbon' research. However, the historical lack of data in this area along with financial, ecological and environmental concerns has left its potential unfulfilled. Advancements in research and technical capabilities are once again raising international interest this critical storage area.

Tidal marshes 

Marshes, intertidal ecosystems dominated by herbaceous vegetation, can be found globally on coastlines from the arctic to the subtropics. In the tropics, marshes are replaced by mangroves as the dominant coastal vegetation. 

Marshes have high productivity, with a large portion of primary production in belowground biomass. This belowground biomass can form deposits up to 8m deep. Marshes provide valuable habitat for plants, birds, and juvenile fish, protect coastal habitat from storm surge and flooding, and can reduce nutrient loading to coastal waters. Similarly to mangrove and seagrass habitats, marshes also serve as important carbon sinks. Marshes sequester C in underground biomass due to high rates of organic sedimentation and anaerobic-dominated decomposition. Salt marshes cover approximately 22,000 to 400,000 km2 globally, with an estimated carbon burial rate of 210 g C m−2 yr−1. 

Salt marshes may not be expansive worldwide in relation to forests, but they have a C burial rate that is over 50 times faster than tropical rainforests. Rates of burial have been estimated at up to 87.2 ± 9.6 Tg C yr−1 which is greater than that of tropical rainforests, 53 ± 9.6 Tg C yr−1. Since the 1800s salt marshes have been disturbed due to development and a lack of understanding their importance. The 25% decline since that time has led to a decrease in potential C sink area coupled with the release of once buried C. Consequences of increasingly degraded marsh habitat are a decrease in C stock in sediments, a decrease in plant biomass and thus a decrease in photosynthesis reducing the amount of CO2 taken up by the plants, failure of C in plant blades to be transferred into the sediment, possible acceleration of erosive processes due to the lack of plant biomass, and acceleration of buried C release to the atmosphere.

Tidal marshes have been impacted by humans for centuries, including modification for grazing, haymaking, reclamation for agriculture, development and ports, evaporation ponds for salt production, modification for aquaculture, insect control, tidal power and flood protection. Marshes are also susceptible to pollution from oil, industrial chemicals, and most commonly, eutrophication. Introduced species, sea-level rise, river damming and decreased sedimentation are additional longterm changes that affect marsh habitat, and in turn, may affect carbon sequestration potential.

Mangroves 

Globally, mangroves stored 4.19 ± 0.62 Pg (CI 95%) of carbon in 2012, with Indonesia, Brazil, Malaysia and Papua New Guinea accounting for more than 50% of the global stock. 2.96 ± 0.53 Pg of the global carbon stock is contained within the soil and 1.23 ± 0.06 Pg in the living biomass. Of this 1.23 Pg, approximately 0.41 ± 0.02 Pg is in the belowground biomass in the root system and approximately 0.82 ± 0.04 Pg is in the aboveground living biomass.

Global mangrove canopy cover is estimated as between 83,495 km2 and 167,387 km2 in 2012 with Indonesia containing approximately 30% of the entire global mangrove forest area. Mangrove forests are responsible for approximately 10% of global carbon burial, with an estimated carbon burial rate of 174 g C m−2 yr−1. 

Mangroves, like seagrasses, have potential for high levels of carbon sequestration. They account for 3% of the global carbon sequestration by tropical forests and 14% of the global coastal ocean's carbon burial. 

Mangroves are naturally disturbed by floods, tsunamis, coastal storms like cyclones and hurricanes, lightning, disease and pests, and changes in water quality or temperature. Although they are resilient to many of these natural disturbances, they are highly susceptible to human impacts including urban development, aquaculture, mining, and overexploitation of shellfish, crustaceans, fish and timber. Mangroves provide globally important ecosystem services and carbon sequestration and are thus an important habitat to conserve and repair when possible.

Dams threaten habitats by slowing the amount of freshwater reaching mangroves. Coral reef destruction also plays a role in mangrove habitat health as reefs slow wave energy to a level that mangroves are more tolerant of.

Seagrass 

Although seagrass makes up only 0.1% of the area of the ocean floor, it accounts for approximately 10–18% of the total oceanic carbon burial. Currently global seagrass meadows are estimated to store as much as 19.9 Pg (gigaton, or billion tons) of organic carbon. There has been considerable attention to how large-scale seaweed cultivation in the open ocean can act as a form of carbon sequestration. Studies have demonstrated that nearshore seaweed forests constitute a source of blue carbon, as seaweed detritus is carried by wave currents into the middle and deep ocean thereby sequestering carbon.

Carbon primarily accumulates in marine sediments, which are anoxic and thus continually preserve organic carbon from decadal-millennial time scales. High accumulation rates, low oxygen, low sediment conductivity and slower microbial decomposition rates all encourage carbon burial and carbon accumulation in these coastal sediments. 

Compared to terrestrial habitats that lose carbon stocks as CO2 during decomposition or by disturbances like fires or deforestation, marine carbon sinks can retain C for much longer time periods. Carbon sequestration rates in seagrass meadows vary depending on the species, characteristics of the sediment, and depth of the habitats, but on average the carbon burial rate is approximately 138 g C m−2 yr−1. 

Seagrass habitats are threatened by coastal eutrophication, increased seawater temperatures, increased sedimentation and coastal development, and sea level rise which may decrease light availability for photosynthesis. Seagrass loss has accelerated over the past few decades, from 0.9% per year prior to 1940 to 7% per year in 1990, with about 1/3 of global loss since WWII. Decline in seagrasses are due to a number of factors including drought, water quality issues, agricultural practices, invasive species, pathogens, fishing and climate change.

Scientists encourage protection and continued research of these ecosystems for organic carbon storage, valuable habitat and other ecosystem services.

Restored seagrass meadows were found to start sequestering carbon in sediment within about four years. This was the time needed for the meadow to reach sufficient shoot density to cause sediment deposition.

Example projects 
Microsoft and Running Tide signed Two-Year agreement in 2023 to remove up to 12,000 tons of carbon through an ocean-based carbon removal system. 

In Canada, a North Atlantic Carbon Observatory (NACO) project is underway to establish an accurate measurement of the ocean’s ability to continue to absorb carbon with particular emphasis on deep blue capacity.

In Denmark, the "Greensand" project  is underway to capture carbon at source and deposit it in the deep blue regions of the North Sea, creating a 'CO2 graveyard'. The project is expected to store up to eight million tonnes of CO2 per year by 2030.

A restoration project in South Australia will cover  of mangroves, salt marsh and sea grasses extending  in the St Vincents Gulf and Spencer Gulf in South Australia. The project will also look at various possibilities of insuring the huge expanse of existing blue carbon ecosystems.

In South Korea, macroalgae have been utilized as part of a climate change mitigation program. The country has established the Coastal CO2 Removal Belt (CCRB) which is composed of artificial and natural ecosystems. The goal is to capture carbon using large areas of kelp forest.  

Marine permaculture also fixes carbon in seaweed forest projects offshore in Tasmania and the Philippines, with potential use from the tropics to temperate oceans.

See also

 Ocean Data Viewer: contains datasets on worldwide sea grasses, mangroves and salt marshes
 UN Decade for Ocean Science for Sustainable Development
 UN Decade on Ecosystem Restoration

References

External links 
 The Ocean Frontier Institute
 The Blue Carbon Initiative

 
Biological oceanography
Biomass
Chemical oceanography
Ecosystems